Grand general is a supreme military rank which is normally the accepted translation of:

The Indonesian rank jenderal besar 
The Nepal military rank of pradhan senadhipati
 The Chinese rank of da jiang

Grand General is alike to a six-star general. In Thailand, the rank will be automatically given to the His Majesty the king as the highest-ranking ruler of all 3 branches  (army, airforce and the navy) Although the position now is reduced to only ceremonial purposes as in uniforms His Majesty wear will reflect the specific branch due to colour of insignias and rank with the reflection on complex and elegance decoration and badges.

Military ranks
Generals